The Colombian Football Federation (in ) is the governing body of football in Colombia. It was founded in 1924 and has been affiliated to FIFA since 1936. It is a member of CONMEBOL and is in charge of the Colombia national football team.

Presidents

 1936: Carlos Lafourie Roncallo
 1948: Bernardo Jaramillo García
 1951: Eduardo Carbonell Insignares
 1957: Efraín Borrero
 1957: Rafael Fernández
 1958: Efraín Borrero
 1961: Pedro Nery López
 1962: Luis Benedetti Gómez
 1964: Eduardo Carbonell Insignares
 1964: Alfonso Senior Quevedo
 1971: Eduardo Carbonell Insignares
 1975: Alfonso Senior Quevedo
 1982: León Londoño Tamayo
 1992: Juan José Bellini
 1995: Hernán Mejía Campuzano (interim)
 1996: Álvaro Fina Domínguez
 2002: Óscar Astudillo Palomino
 2006: Luis Bedoya Giraldo
 2015-present: Ramón Jesurún Franco

References

External links

FCF Website
Colombia at FIFA site

Colombia
Football in Colombia
Football
Sports organizations established in 1924